The 1999 Mercedes Cup was a men's tennis tournament played on outdoor clay courts at the Tennis Club Weissenhof in Stuttgart, Germany and was part of the Championship Series of the 1999 ATP Tour. The tournament was held from 19 July until 25 July 1999. Unseeded Magnus Norman won the singles title.

Finals

Singles

 Magnus Norman defeated  Tommy Haas 6–7(6–8), 4–6, 7–6(9–7), 6–0, 6–3
 It was Norman's 2nd singles title of the year and the 4th of his career.

Doubles

 Jaime Oncins /  Daniel Orsanic defeated  Aleksandar Kitinov /  Jack Waite 6–2, 6–1
 It was Oncins's 3rd title of the year and the 5th of his career. It was Orsanic's 2nd title of the year and the 7th of his career.

References

External links
 Official website 
 ATP tournament profile
 ITF tournament edition details

Stuttgart Open
1999
July 1999 sports events in Europe
1999 in German tennis